The 2007 Milan–San Remo race took place on March 24, 2007. The race featured the Passo del Turchino, the Cipressa and the Poggio. In the sprint, Freire emerged from the wheel of Milram's 2005 victor Alessandro Petacchi to take his second victory in this race, following success in 2004.

General standings

2007-03-24: Milan-Sanremo, 294 km

External links
Race website

March 2007 sports events in Europe
2007 UCI ProTour
2007
2007 in Italian sport
2007 in road cycling